Lethrinops microdon is an endangered species of cichlid endemic to the southern part of Lake Malawi where it occurs at depths of  in areas with soft substrates.  This species grow to a length of  SL. The species is threatened by trawl fisheries and has greatly declined but little is known about its population and distribution within Lake Malawi, it is given a status of Data Deficient by the IUCN.

References

microdon
Fish of Malawi
Fish of Lake Malawi
Fish described in 1977
Taxa named by David Henry Eccles
Taxa named by Digby S. C. Lewis
Taxonomy articles created by Polbot